Chennai Spartans was a men's volleyball team from Chennai, Tamil Nadu playing in the Pro Volleyball League in India.

Chennai Spartans made to final after beating Kochi Blue Spikers in semi-finals in 2019 season. In finals, they beat Calicut Heroes to win their maiden title.

Team

Source :

References 

Volleyball in India
Men's volleyball teams
Sports teams in Tamil Nadu